, formerly Chuo Mitsui Trust Holdings, Inc., is a Japanese financial holding company headquartered in Chiyoda, Tokyo. It provides an assortment of financial products to retail and wholesale customers, with a focus on asset management, financial brokerage and real estate services.

The company has no capital relationship with the Sumitomo Mitsui Financial Group; the two banking groups are similarly named because both are descended from the historical Sumitomo and Mitsui conglomerates.

There is just a weak control relationship between Sumitomo Mitsui Trust Holdings and Sumitomo Mitsui Financial Group. In fact SM Trust Holdings controls about 66% of Japan Trustee Services Bank. As of March 31, 2017, SM Financial Group's website reports that Japan Trustee Services Bank owned 5.50% of Sumitomo Mitsui Financial Group, but also 1.52% from trust location n. 1 (信託口1), 1.50% from trust location n. 2 (信託口2), 2.05% from location n. 5 (信託口5), 1.36% from trust location n. 7 (信託口7), and 1.85% from trust location n. 9 (信託口9) as well.

History

Chuo Mitsui
SMT's earliest predecessor was The Mitsui Trust Company, Limited, established in March 1924 with capital of 30 million yen. In March 1948, it changed its name to The Tokyo Trust & Banking Co., Ltd. It changed its name again to The Mitsui Trust and Banking Company, Limited in 1952.

The Chuo Trust & Banking Co., Ltd. was established in May 1962 with capital of 2.5 billion yen and support from Tokai Bank, Dai-Ichi Bank, Industrial Bank of Japan and other financial institutions. It took over Tokai and Dai-Ichi's trust businesses as well as the stock transfer agency business of Japan Securities Agents, Ltd. It acquired the Honshu operations of Hokkaido Takushoku Bank in 1998.

Mitsui Trust and Chuo Trust signed a merger agreement in May 1999 and completed their merger in April 2000, becoming . In 2001, Chuo Mitsui announced its plans to establish a new bank holding company known as Mitsui Trust Holdings, Inc., which was formed in February 2002.

Sumitomo Trust
Sumitomo Trust Co., Ltd. was founded in July 1925 with capital of 20 million yen and its headquarters in Awajicho, Osaka. It changed its name to Fuji Trust & Banking Co., Ltd. in 1948 and adopted the name  in 1952. In 1962 it moved its headquarters to the Sumitomo Building in Kitahama, Osaka.

Merger
Chuo Mitsui agreed to merge with The Sumitomo Trust and Banking Co., Ltd. in November 2009, and formed a holding company, Sumitomo Mitsui Trust Holdings, Inc., by a share exchange between Chuo Mitsui and Sumitomo Trust in April 2011. The three main trust banks under this holding company merged in April 2012 to form Sumitomo Mitsui Trust Bank, Limited. SMTB became the largest trust bank in Japan and the fifth-largest commercial bank overall measured by assets.

SMTB was fined for insider trading in 2012, after a Chuo Mitsui fund manager was found to have traded on information leaked from Nomura Securities regarding a 2010 share issuance by Mizuho Financial Group.

References 

Companies listed on the Tokyo Stock Exchange
Companies listed on the Osaka Exchange
Banks of Japan
Mitsui
Government-owned companies of Japan
Sumitomo Group
Banks established in 2002
Holding companies established in 2002
Japanese companies established in 2002
Financial services companies based in Tokyo
Holding companies based in Tokyo